Lisa Milroy (born 16 January 1959 in Vancouver, British Columbia) is an Anglo-Canadian artist known for her still life paintings of everyday objects. In the 1980s Milroy’s paintings featured ordinary objects depicted against an off-white background. Subsequently her imagery expanded, which led to a number of different series including landscapes, buildings and portraits. As her approaches to still life diversified, so did her manner of painting, giving rise to a range of stylistic innovations. Throughout her practice, Milroy has been fascinated by the relation between stillness and movement, and the nature of making and looking at painting.

In 1977, aged 18, Milroy travelled to Paris and studied at the Paris-Sorbonne University. In 1978 she moved to London for a foundation course at Saint Martin's School of Art and gained her BFA at Goldsmiths College, University of London in 1982.
Her first solo exhibition in 1984 was based on still life.  In 1989 she won the John Moores Painting Prize. Milroy has taught at the Slade School of Fine Art, London since 2009. She gained election to membership of the Royal Academy of Arts in 2005. Milroy was appointed Artist Trustee of Tate from 2013-2017 and Liaison Trustee to the National Gallery from 2015 - 2017.

In 2015 Milroy set up Hands On Art Workshops, contributing to Vodafone Foundation and UNHCR’s Instant Network Schools digital learning programme. Hands On Art Workshops engages primary and secondary school students in Kakuma Refugee Camp, Kenya in practical art workshops, which Milroy delivers from London through live interactive video conference sessions. Milroy travels to Kakuma Refugee Camp annually to deliver Hands On Art Workshops, working with UNHCR Kakuma.

Public Collections 
Public collections including her work include: Walker Art Gallery, Shire Hall, Stafford, Wolverhampton Art Gallery, Swindon Museum and Art Gallery, Royal Academy of Arts, Arts Council Collection, Southampton City Art Gallery, Tate, Portsmouth City Museum and National Trust.

References

External links
Lisa Milroy's Personal Webpage and Online Archive

University of Paris alumni
Alumni of the University of London
1959 births
Living people
Canadian women painters
Canadian contemporary painters
Canadian expatriates in England
Alumni of Saint Martin's School of Art
People associated with the Tate galleries
Artists from London
Artists from Vancouver
Royal Academicians
21st-century Canadian women artists